Kevin Hardiman is a special Olympian native of Aille, Killeenadeema, Loughrea.

Hardiman participated in the 2007 Special Olympics, representing Ireland, playing Badminton, where he won a Bronze medal.

References
Killeenadeema Aille: History and Heritage/Stair agus Oidhreacht, ed. Pat O'Looney, killeenadeema Historical and Heritage Society, 2009. 

Irish male badminton players
Sportspeople from County Galway
Living people
Year of birth missing (living people)
21st-century Irish people